NH 12A may refer to:

 National Highway 12A (India)
 New Hampshire Route 12A, United States